Arvīds Reķis (born January 1, 1979) is a Latvian former professional ice hockey defenceman who most notably played for the Augsburger Panther in the Deutsche Eishockey Liga (DEL).

Playing career
He began his career playing junior level in North America, firstly in the United States Hockey League for the Dubuque Fighting Saints and then the Ontario Hockey League for the Erie Otters where he spent four seasons.  In 2000, he joined the Indianapolis Ice of the Central Hockey League for their playoff campaign in which the Ice went on to win the Ray Miron President's Cup.  He signed as a free-agent with the St. Louis Blues and was assigned to the ECHL for the Peoria Rivermen and also had a spell in the American Hockey League with the Worcester IceCats. He moved to the DEL in 2003 and remained there until the end of season 2009-10.

Rekis played ten seasons throughout his career with Augsburger Panther, retiring following the 2018–19 season, as the oldest participant in the DEL at age 40, on April 26, 2019.

International play
He has also represented the Latvia national ice hockey team in numerous Ice Hockey World Championships and the 2006, 2010 and 2014 Winter Olympics.

Career statistics

Regular season and playoffs

International

References

External links
 
 
 
 

1979 births
Living people
Augsburger Panther players
Dinamo Riga players
Dubuque Fighting Saints players
Erie Otters players
HK Liepājas Metalurgs players
Ice hockey players at the 2006 Winter Olympics
Ice hockey players at the 2010 Winter Olympics
Ice hockey players at the 2014 Winter Olympics
Indianapolis Ice (CHL) players
Latvian ice hockey defencemen
Olympic ice hockey players of Latvia
People from Jūrmala
Peoria Rivermen (ECHL) players
Worcester IceCats players